Amendola is a surname of Italian origin. Notable people with the surname include:

Anna Amendola (born 1927), Italian actress
Alessia Amendola (born 1984), Italian voice actress
Beatriz Amendola, expert in the field of Radiation Oncology 
Buddy Amendola (1930-1994), college football coach
Claudio Amendola (born 1963), Italian actor, director and television presenter
Danny Amendola (born 1985), American football player
Ferrante Amendola (1664-1724), Italian historical painter
Ferruccio Amendola (1930-2001), Italian actor and voice actor
Giorgio Amendola (1907-1980), Italian communist politician and writer, son of Giovanni Amendola
Giovanni Amendola (1882-1926),  Italian journalist and politician
Giovanni Battista Amendola (1848-1887), Italian 19th-century sculptor
Guiscardo Améndola (1906-1972), Uruguayan painter 
Mario Amendola (1910-1993), Italian screenwriter and film director
Matt Ammendola (born 1996), American football player
Orlando Amêndola, former Brazilian Olympic swimmer, Water polo player and rower 
Pino Ammendola (born 1951), Italian film actor
Sal Amendola (born 1948), Italian-American comic book artist
Salvador Amendola (born 1906, date of death unknown), Brazilian water polo player
Scott Amendola (born 1969), American jazz drummer and composer
Tony Amendola (born 1951), American actor
Vincenzo Amendola (born 1973), Italian politician

References

Italian-language surnames